Tarset Castle is a ruin near Tarset in Northumberland.

History
A licence to crenellate was granted to John Comyn in 1267, and the castle was built half a mile south-west of the present village of Tarset. The castle, which had  four square corner turrets, was destroyed by the Scots shortly after the Battle of Bannockburn in June 1314. All that remains now is some stone foundations on top of a mound.

The remains of the castle are a Grade II* listed structure.

References

Castles in Northumberland
1314 in England
Grade II* listed buildings in Northumberland
Clan Comyn